Siurana may refer to a number of villages in Catalonia:
 Siurana (Tarragona)
 Siurana, Alt Empordà